Chillaton is a village in the county of Devon, England, about 6 miles north of Tavistock. The village is part of the electoral ward of Milton Ford. Its population at the 2011 census was 1,617.

References

Villages in Devon